William McLeod is a Paralympian track and field athlete and lawn bowls player from Scotland competing mainly in category A events. In 1976 he competed as a lawn bowls player at the Summer Paralympis, winning a silver medal in the Men's singles. Four years later, at the 1980 Summer Paralympics in New York, he took gold in the Lawn Bowls Men's singles and the 60m sprint.

He was appointed a Member of the Order of the British Empire (MBE) in the 1985 Birthday Honours for services to sport for the disabled.

References 

 

Living people
Scottish male sprinters
Scottish disabled sportspeople
Track and field athletes with disabilities
Sportsmen with disabilities
Scottish male bowls players
Paralympic athletes of Great Britain
Paralympic lawn bowls players of Great Britain
Paralympic gold medalists for Great Britain
Paralympic silver medalists for Great Britain
Athletes (track and field) at the 1980 Summer Paralympics
Athletes (track and field) at the 1984 Summer Paralympics
Lawn bowls players at the 1976 Summer Paralympics
Lawn bowls players at the 1980 Summer Paralympics
Medalists at the 1976 Summer Paralympics
Medalists at the 1980 Summer Paralympics
Year of birth missing (living people)
Scottish Paralympic competitors
Paralympic medalists in athletics (track and field)
Paralympic medalists in lawn bowls
Members of the Order of the British Empire